Krar (Amharic: ክራር) is a five-or-six stringed bowl-shaped lyre from Ethiopia and Eritrea. It is tuned to a pentatonic scale. A modern Krar may be amplified, much in the same way as an electric guitar or violin. The Krar, along with Masenqo and the Washint, is one of the most widespread musical instruments of the Amhara ethnic group.

Role in Amhara society

Historical 
In Amhara society the krar was viewed as an instrument inspired by the Devil and was therefore inferior, whereas the Begena was for praising God and seen as sacred. The krar was used to adulate feminine beauty, to create sexual arousal and to eulogize carnal love.

The instrument has been associated with brigands, outlaws and wanderers. Wanderers played the krar to solicit food, and outlaws played it to sing an Amhara war song called Fano.

Contemporary
Today, the krar which used to be the plaything of the Amharas, has become one of the most popular Ethiopian stringed instruments.

The krar is and was always used to accompany and perform secular song, love songs and (vulgar) poetry. The instrument are often played by Poet-musicians called the Azmari

Features

A chordophone, the krar is usually decorated with wood, cloth and beads. Its five or six strings determine the available pitches. The instrument's tone depends on the musician's playing technique: bowing, strumming or plucking.  If plucked, the instrument will produce a soft tone. Strumming, on the other hand, will yield a harmonious pulsation.

Resources 
 Asnakech Worku, Ethiopiques 16: The Lady with the Krar (compact disc). Buda Musique 822652, 2003.
 Ethiopie, chants d'amour (Ethiopia, Love Songs).  Fantahun Shewankochew, vocals and krar (compact disc). INEDIT/Maison des Cultures du Monde W260080, 1998.

Films
HELP! – Musikalische Geschichten aus Äthiopien.  Directed by Daniel Schulz.

See also 
Begena

References

Eritrean musical instruments
Ethiopian musical instruments
Lyres